Fenbutrazate (INN), also known as phenbutrazate (BAN), is a psychostimulant used as an appetite suppressant under the trade names Cafilon, Filon, and Sabacid in Europe, Japan, and Hong Kong. It is a derivative of phenmetrazine and may function as a prodrug due to its similarity to phendimetrazine.

See also 
 Morazone
 Phendimetrazine
 Phenmetrazine

References 

Anorectics
Antiobesity drugs
Carboxylate esters
Substituted amphetamines
Phenylmorpholines
Norepinephrine-dopamine releasing agents
Stimulants